Sinatra '65: The Singer Today is a 1965 compilation album by Frank Sinatra.

The album is a collection of various singles and sessions, highlighted by the hits "Luck Be a Lady", "Anytime At All", "Somewhere In Your Heart", "Stay With Me", and "Tell Her (You Love Her Each Day)."  The version of "My Kind of Town" featured here is not the edited single version.  This soundtrack recording contains a verse before the chorus that was edited out of the single version. It is possible the album title was a nod to the Beatles' December 1964 Capitol album Beatles '65, and potentially the Beach Boys' March 1965 Capitol album The Beach Boys Today!.

This album is available on compact disc, and all the songs are available on The Complete Reprise Studio Recordings.

Track listing
"Tell Her (You Love Her Each Day)" (Gil Ward, Charles Watkins) - 2:42
"Anytime at All" (Baker Knight) - 2:22
"Stay With Me (Main Theme from "The Cardinal")" (Jerome Moross, Carolyn Leigh) - 3:04
"I Like to Lead When I Dance" (Sammy Cahn, Jimmy Van Heusen) - 4:07
"You Brought a New Kind of Love to Me" (Sammy Fain, Irving Kahal, Pierre Norman Connor) - 2:38
"My Kind of Town" (unedited version) (Cahn, Van Heusen) - 3:09
"When Somebody Loves You" (Cahn, Van Heusen) - 1:54
"Somewhere in Your Heart" (Russell Faith, Clarence Keltner) - 2:29
"I've Never Been In Love Before" (Frank Loesser) - 2:57
"When I'm Not Near The Girl I Love" (E.Y. Harburg, Burton Lane) - 3:25
"Luck Be a Lady" (Loesser) - 5:18

Personnel
 Frank Sinatra - vocals
 Ernie Freeman - arranger, conductor
 Nelson Riddle
 Don Costa
 Billy May - arranger
 Gordon Jenkins - conductor
 Morris Stoloff

References

1965 compilation albums
Frank Sinatra compilation albums
Reprise Records compilation albums
Albums arranged by Nelson Riddle
Albums conducted by Ernie Freeman
Albums conducted by Nelson Riddle
Albums conducted by Don Costa
Albums conducted by Billy May
Albums conducted by Gordon Jenkins
Albums conducted by Morris Stoloff
Albums arranged by Ernie Freeman
Albums arranged by Don Costa
Albums arranged by Billy May
Albums arranged by Gordon Jenkins
Albums arranged by Morris Stoloff